Gohar Zamin Sirjan Futsal Club is an Iranian professional futsal club based in Sirjan.

Honours 
 Iran Futsal's 1st Division
 Winners (1): 2021–22

Players

Current squad

Personnel

Current technical staff

Last updated: 17 October 2022

References 

Futsal clubs in Iran
Sport in Kerman Province